Gentleman from Dixie is a 1941 American drama film directed by Albert Herman and starring Jack La Rue, Marian Marsh and Clarence Muse.

Cast
 Jack La Rue as Thad Terrill 
 Marian Marsh as Margaret Terrill 
 Clarence Muse as Jupe 
 Mary Ruth as Betty Jean Terrill 
 Robert Kellard as Lance Terrill 
 John Holland as Brawley 
 Lillian Randolph as Aunt Eppie 
 John Elliott as Prosecutor 
 Herbert Rawlinson as Prison Warden 
 I. Stanford Jolley as Kirkland 
 Joe Hernandez as Race Announcer 
 Phyllis Barry as Secretary 
 Clarence Muse Singers as Singers

References

Bibliography
 S. Torriano Berry, Venise T. Berry. The A to Z of African American Cinema. Scarecrow Press, 2009.

External links
 

1941 films
1941 drama films
American drama films
Films directed by Albert Herman
Monogram Pictures films
American black-and-white films
1940s English-language films
1940s American films